Palaetheta is a genus of moths of the family Yponomeutidae.

Species
Palaetheta innocua - Meyrick, 1911 
Palaetheta ischnozona - Meyrick, 1909

References

Notes

External links

Yponomeutidae